Andruew Tang You Liang (born 28 February 1989) is a Singaporean professional wrestler. He is the co-founder and head coach of Singapore Pro Wrestling, where he also performs as a wrestler under the ring name "The Statement" Andruew Tang. He is the first Singaporean professional wrestler and a 4-time SPW Southeast Asian Champion. Tang is also the longest reigning SPW SEA Champion with a record of 862 days in his fourth reign.

Early life 
Tang was born in Singapore on 28 February 1989. At the age of 12, Tang watched pro wrestling for the first time and fell in love with it. Tang would decide that he wanted to become a professional wrestler, however he struggled as professional wrestling was nonexistent in Singapore. Tang would serve in the Singapore Armed Forces, where he would be selected for Officer Cadet School.

Professional wrestling career

Singapore Pro Wrestling (2012-present) 
Andruew Tang founded Singapore Pro Wrestling (SPW) in February 2012, alongside Vadim Koryagin. At SPWs wrestling school, he and Koryagin trained many wrestlers including, Kaiser Trexxus and The Eurasian Dragon.

In 2014 Tang teamed with Trexxus forming a tag team known as Onslaught. The duo would win the inaugural SPW Tag Team Championship, defeating MK & Affi at SPW: Breakthrough. Onslaught would defend their title against Bit Man and Ho Ho Lun at SPW Prove 3. On 10 May 2015, Onslaught was forced to relinquish their tag team championships due to Trexxus's national service commitments.Tang was the inaugural SPW Southeast Asian Champion, after beating Arsenal Affi in a match in October 2015. Tang would hold the title until March 2016, where he would lose to Masa Takanashi. In May 2016, Tang would defeat CIMA and Takanashi to win back his title, becoming the first two-time SEA champion. Eventually, Tang would become the head coach of SPW, while Koryagin would focus more towards the business side.

Onslaught would be joined by Destroyer Dharma, who become an ally of Tang. In 2017, tensions would rise with his tag team partner, Trexxus. The two faced each other in January, and Tang lost his SEA title to Trexxus at SPW Unchained In Changi. He spent the next two years facing wrestlers from all over the world including Pete Dunne, Tajiri and Rene Dupree.

In 2019, Tang was invited as one of three Singaporean wrestlers, alongside Kaiser Trexxus and Alexis Lee, to take part in a WWE tryout. Only Trexxus was selected after the tryouts. In May, Tang would win the SEA title for the third time, defeating Lokomotiv, Jake De Leon and Trexxus, at SPW Atonement. During that year he would take part in a 6-man tag team match alongside Trexxus, and Da Butcherman where they would face Cima, Shaolin Monk and world-renowned wrestler, Kenny Omega at SPW Klash of Kings.

Tang held the belt until eventually losing to Shaukat in January 2020, in a winner-take-all match where Shaukat's MYPW World-To-Regional Title was also on the line. After Shaukat was forced to relinquish his title due to a concussion, Tang would win the title for a fourth time in February 2020, defeating JY Eagle, holding it ever since. At SPW Prove: Alive & Kicking #1, Dharma would turn on Onslaught, teaming with Aiden Rex to defeat Tang and Trexxus. 

In May 2021, Tang defeated Kaiser Trexxus, retiring him from SPW, and Trexxus would later debut on WWE NXT under the ring name Dante Chen.  Later that month, Tang would become the longest reigning SEA champion of all time, beating Lokomotiv's record of 462 days. Tang would later lose the belt to Aiden Rex, at SPW: Homecoming, after a 862 day reign.

Acting career 
Tang made his acting debut in Jack Neo's 2022 film, Ah Girls Go Army Again, as a martial arts instructor named Sergeant Hulk Tan.

Personal life 
To make ends meet as he began to train as a pro-wrestler, Tang had a full-time marketing position at Bishan GYMMBOXX.

Tang's dream wrestling match is against, Rey Mysterio, but he also wishes to partake in a singles match against Kenny Omega.

In 2019, Tang was charged with four counts of cheating  and sentenced to two weeks of jail in September 2021, after being found guilty of leading banks, OCBC and Maybank, to believe that he was the ultimate beneficial owners of three various firms in order to open accounts for these firms, when in reality he was a resident nominee director, abetting the true beneficial owner, Vadim, who himself would be sentenced to four weeks in jail. In April 2022, Tang and the others involved in the case appealed against their conviction and sentences, however, it was denied.

Filmography

Championships and accomplishments 

 Hong Kong Pro Wrestling Federation
 AWGC Junior Heavyweight Title (2 times, current)  
Singapore Pro Wrestling
SPW Southeast Asian Championship (4 times) 
SPW Southeast Asian Tag Team Championships (1 time) - with Kaiser Trexxus

References 

Living people
Singaporean male professional wrestlers
21st-century professional wrestlers
1989 births